Goodrich is an unincorporated community in Adams County, Idaho, United States.

Notes

Unincorporated communities in Adams County, Idaho
Unincorporated communities in Idaho